Hilda C. Martin (June 16, 1934 – October 26, 1995) was an American politician from Maine. Martin, a Democrat, served in the Maine House of Representatives from 1981 to 1994. She was a resident of Van Buren, Maine.

References

1934 births
1995 deaths
People from Van Buren, Maine
Women state legislators in Maine
Democratic Party members of the Maine House of Representatives
20th-century American women politicians
20th-century American politicians